The 2021 English football summer transfer window runs from 24 May to 31 August 2021. Players without a club may be signed at any time, clubs may sign players on loan dependent on their league's regulations, and clubs may sign a goalkeeper on an emergency loan if they have no registered senior goalkeeper available. This list includes transfers featuring at least one club from either the Premier League or the EFL Championship that were completed after the end of the winter 2020–21 transfer window on 2 February and before the end of the 2021 summer window.

Transfers
All players and clubs without a flag are English. Note that while Cardiff City, Swansea City and Newport County are affiliated with the Football Association of Wales and thus take the Welsh flag, they play in the Championship and League Two respectively, and so their transfers are included here.

Loans

References

External links
 BBC Sport June 2021 Transfer list

England
Summer 2021
2021–22 in English football